Kosal may refer to:

 Kosal state movement, campaign for Western Odisha to be a separate state.
 Kosala (disambiguation), historical regions in India
 Western Odisha, western part of Odisha state

See also 
 Kosali (disambiguation)
 Kosel (disambiguation)
 Koshala
 Kaushal